Amina Fouad (born ) is a retired Egyptian female volleyball player.

She was part of the Egypt women's national volleyball team at the 2002 FIVB Volleyball Women's World Championship in Germany.  On club level she played with Elahly.

Clubs
 Elahly (2002)

References

External links 
http://www.worldofvolley.com/wov-community/players/47984/amina-fouad-abd-elsalam-.html
http://www.fivb.org/vis_web/volley/wwch2002/pdf/match030.pdf

1980 births
Living people
Egyptian women's volleyball players
Place of birth missing (living people)